Johan Snick Guzmán de los Santos (born 3 July 1997) is a Dominican professional footballer who plays as a goalkeeper for Spanish club Real Ávila and the Dominican Republic national team.

References

External links
Johan Guzmán en Fútbol Dominicano. Net

1997 births
Living people
People from San Juan de la Maguana
Dominican Republic footballers
Association football forwards
Atlético Pantoja players
Liga Dominicana de Fútbol players
Tercera División players
Dominican Republic international footballers
Dominican Republic expatriate footballers
Dominican Republic expatriate sportspeople in Spain
Expatriate footballers in Spain